Aleksandr Kolotov (born 4 March 1964) is a Russian former water polo player who competed in the 1988 Summer Olympics and in the 1992 Summer Olympics.

See also
 List of Olympic medalists in water polo (men)

References

External links
 

1964 births
Living people
Soviet male water polo players
Russian male water polo players
Olympic water polo players of the Soviet Union
Olympic water polo players of the Unified Team
Water polo players at the 1988 Summer Olympics
Water polo players at the 1992 Summer Olympics
Olympic bronze medalists for the Soviet Union
Olympic bronze medalists for the Unified Team
Olympic medalists in water polo
Medalists at the 1992 Summer Olympics
Medalists at the 1988 Summer Olympics